The 1993 San Diego State Aztecs football team represented San Diego State University during the 1993 NCAA Division I-A football season as a member of the Western Athletic Conference (WAC).

The team was led by head coach Al Luginbill, in his fourth year. They played home games at Jack Murphy Stadium in San Diego, California. The Aztecs offense scored 413 points while the defense allowed 392 points. They completed the season with a record of six wins, six losses (6–6, 4–4 WAC).

Schedule

Team players in the NFL
The following were selected in the 1994 NFL Draft.

The following finished their college career in 1993, were not drafted, but played in the NFL.

Team awards

Notes

References

San Diego State
San Diego State Aztecs football seasons
San Diego State Aztecs football